Dusa is an extinct genus of prawns.

Dusa may also refer to:

People 
David Dusa (born 1979), Swedish film director
Ferdiš Duša (1888–1958), Czech painter
Dusa McDuff (born 1945), British mathematician
Cosmina Dușa (born 1990), Romanian football player
Duša Počkaj (1924–1982), Slovenian actress

Places 
 Dusa (Numidia), an ancient city in Numidia, in present-day Algiers
 Duša, Bosnia and Herzegovina

Other uses 

 DUSA Pharmaceuticals, American company
 Deakin University Student Association, Australia
 Dundee University Students' Association, Scotland

See also 
 Dušan, a given name

Slavic feminine given names